Diocophora is a genus of flies in the family Phoridae.

Species
D. appretiata (Schmitz, 1923)
D. armigera (Borgmeier, 1925)
D. assimilata (Borgmeier, 1925)
D. commutata (Borgmeier, 1925)
D. disparifrons Borgmeier, 1959
D. duplexseta Disney, 2008
D. longichaeta Disney, 2007
D. modesta Borgmeier, 1959
D. multichaeta Brown & Disney, 2009
D. multichaeta Disney, 2007
D. palpalis Borgmeier, 1963
D. praedasicara Disney, 2007
D. spinifemorata (Malloch, 1912)
D. spiniventris (Borgmeier, 1925)
D. trichogaster Borgmeier, 1963

References

Phoridae
Platypezoidea genera